Leverkusener Jazztage is a jazz festival in Germany, held annually in October since 1980. It was established to  celebrate the Leverkusen's birthday, and has become a festival with over 20,000 annual visitors.

History
The festival was first held in 1980. In the 1990s it expanded to include Latin music, rock, electronic music and funk.
In 2014, Gregory Porter, Dr. John & The Nite Trippers and Tower Of Power performed at the festival.

Notable performers

 Chet Baker
 Lester Bowie
 Dee Dee Bridgewater
 James Brown
 Dave Brubeck
 Ray Charles
 Chick Corea
 Jamie Cullum
 Miles Davis
 Al Di Meola
 Candy Dulfer
 Ibrahim Ferrer
 Jan Garbarek
 Herbie Hancock
 Allan Holdsworth
 Incognito
 Al Jarreau
 Kool & The Gang
 Paco de Lucía
 John McLaughlin
 Miriam Makeba
 Mariza
 Marcus Miller
 Maceo Parker
 Lucky Peterson
 Oscar Peterson
 Michel Petrucciani
 Gregory Porter
 Joe Robinson
 Wayne Shorter
 Jimmy Smith
 Carmen Souza
 Tower of Power
 Johnny Guitar Watson
 Zaz

References

Jazz festivals in Germany